Mezgo is an album by bassist Eddie Gómez recorded in Tokyo in 1985 and originally released on the Japanese Epic label the following year before being released worldwide as Discovery on Columbia.

Reception

The AllMusic review by Paul Kohler called it "A powerful recording" and stated "Musically this album covers jazz and classical and a little avant-garde".

Track listing
All compositions by Eddie Gómez except where noted 
 "Me Two" (Eddie Gomez, Steve Gadd) – 7:26	
 "Capricious Fantasy" (Gomez, Michael Brecker) – 5:47
 "Puccini's Walk" – 6:02
 "Delgado" – 6:35
 "Caribbean Morning" – 4:12
 "Scott Davis" – 3:56
 "Cello Sonata in G Minor: 1st Movement" (Henry Eccles) – 4:41

Personnel
Eddie Gómez − bass
Michael Brecker – tenor saxophone, Steinerphone (tracks 1-4)
Masahiko Satoh − Rhodes piano, synthesizer, piano, arranger (tracks 1, 4, 5 & 7)
Steve Gadd – drums (tracks 1, 3, 4 & 5)
Takashi Fukumori, Hiromichi Hara, Yukio Kaneda, Hachiro Ohmatsu, Kiyoshi Ohsawa, Yasuko Seki, Chizuko Tsunoda  – violin (track 7)
Yoshinao Azuma,  Hiroshi Watanabe – viola (track 7)
Hiroto Kawamura, Tomio Yazima – cello (track 7)
Takashi Katoh – concertmaster (track 7)
Nobuhiko Nakayama – synthesizer programming

References

Columbia Records albums
Eddie Gómez albums
1986 albums